Lake Chyortovo or Lozil-To, also known as "Chertovo" (meaning "Devil's Lake" ; Selkup: Лозыль'-то) is a freshwater lake in Yamalo-Nenets Autonomous Okrug, Russia.

The lake is a traditional sacred site for the indigenous Selkup people of the region. Legend says the lake is so deep it has no bottom.

Geography
Chyortovo is located north of the Arctic circle, in the southeastern part of the okrug. It is a chain of lakes roughly aligned from west to east. They are connected with each other by streams. It has an hourglass shape and an island in the northern part. The largest lake is at the eastern end. The lakes' outflow is the Tolka, a left tributary of the Taz, which flows very close to the east.

Fauna
Among the fish species found in the lake, the tugun (Coregonus tugun) is much appreciated.

See also
Chain of lakes 
List of lakes of Russia

References

External links
Чёртово озеро - фильм о Селькупах, коренных народах севера.
Оценка туристско-рекреационного потенциала и туристской привлекательности в контексте устойчивого развития Ямало-Ненецкого автономного округа
Покотылькы (река, впадает в Верхнее Чёртово озеро)
Chyortovo
Taz basin
Chyortovo